The 1978 Florida Federal Open was a women's singles tennis tournament played on outdoor hard courts at East Lake Woodlands Country Club in Oldsmar, Florida in the United States. The event was part of the AA category of the 1978 Colgate Series. It was the sixth edition of the tournament and was held from November  6 through November 12, 1978. Third-seeded Virginia Wade won the title and earned $14,000 first-prize money.

Finals

Singles
 Virginia Wade defeated  Anna-Maria Fernandez 6–4, 7–6(7–1)
It was Wade's 2nd title of the year and the 54th of her career.

Doubles
 Martina Navratilova /  Anne Smith defeated  Kerry Reid /  Wendy Turnbull 7–6(7–4), 6–3

Prize money

Notes

References

External links
 International Tennis Federation (ITF) tournament event details
  Women's Tennis Association (WTA) tournament event details

Florida Federal Open
Eckerd Open
Florida Federal Open
Florida Federal Open
Florida Federal Open